Survivor 10, also known as Survivor: All-Star, is the tenth season of the popular reality show Survivor Greece. The season premiered on January 8, 2023, and was broadcast on Skai TV in Greece and simulcast on Sigma TV in Cyprus. Giorgos Lianos returned as the host. Celebrating the show's tenth anniversary milestone, the season featured 26 returning competitors from seasons five to nine, competing for €100,000, who have to survive on a deserted beach, at the exotic La Romana in Dominican Republic, having in their luggage, the necessary clothes and basic food supplies.

Contestants
The game started with 26 returning castaways from seasons 5 to 9. The third week (episode 9), three new contestants entered the game: George "Koro" Koromi for the Diasimoi team, Chris Stamoulis and Ria Kolovou for the Machites team. The fourth week (episode 13), Sozon Palaistros-Charos was added to the blue team. The seventh week (episode 28) Eleftheria Eleftheriou, Evridiki Papadopoulou and Christina Kefala were added to the Diasimoi team and Nikolas Agorou, Panagiotis Konstantinidis and Jo Maridaki were added to Machites team. The eighth week (episode 33) Giorikas Pilidis was added to the blue team and Nikoleta Mavridi to the red team,  which were, the last additions to the cast.

Voting history

Nominations table

Matches

Team matches

*Machites were ahead 8-6, but they quit the game and no team won.

Ratings
Official ratings are taken from AGB Hellas.

References

2023 Greek television seasons
10
Television shows filmed in the Dominican Republic